The Return of the Man from U.N.C.L.E.: The Fifteen Years Later Affair is a 1983 American made-for-television action-adventure film based on the 1964–1968 television series The Man from U.N.C.L.E. starring Robert Vaughn and David McCallum reprising the roles they had originated on that program. Several of the crew from the series also worked on the film, which was produced by Viacom rather than Metro-Goldwyn-Mayer and/or Turner Entertainment. Leo G. Carroll had died in 1972, so Patrick Macnee was recruited to appear as an entirely different character, Sir John Raleigh, who had presumably taken over as Number 1 of Section I, the Director of U.N.C.L.E., after Alexander Waverly had died, and Carroll's photograph was displayed prominently in many scenes that featured Macnee's Sir John.

Plot
The criminal international organization T.H.R.U.S.H. steals the bomb H957 and demands $350 million, to be delivered within 72 hours by their former adversary, Napoleon Solo. This forces U.N.C.L.E., the United Network Command for Law and Enforcement, to reactivate the two top agents of its Section II, Solo and Illya Kuryakin, both of whom had left its ranks 15 years before and are now pursuing other lines of civilian work—Kuryakin as a fashion designer whose resignation was acrimonious and precipitated by a professional disaster, Solo as a marketer of computers and independent businessman.

Equipped in their original fashion, Solo and Kuryakin search for the bomb and attempt to close down permanently what proves to be a splinter T.H.R.U.S.H. group; the original organization had fragmented in 1968 after its failure in "The Seven Wonders of the World Affair" and has yet to regain the power to threaten worldwide law and order that it had possessed up to that time.

George Lazenby's cameo appearance as 'J.B.' – driving an Aston Martin and complete with an On Her Majesty's Secret Service name check – made 1983 the year of three Bonds, with the 'battle' at the box office between Roger Moore's sixth outing (Octopussy) and Sean Connery's return to the role after 12 years (in Never Say Never Again).

Major cast 
Robert Vaughn as Napoleon Solo
David McCallum as Illya Kuryakin
Patrick Macnee as Sir John Raleigh
Gayle Hunnicutt as Andrea Markovich
Geoffrey Lewis as Janus
Anthony Zerbe as Justin Sepheran
Tom Mason as Benjamin Kowalski 
Keenan Wynn as Piers Castillian  
Simon Williams as Nigel Pennington-Smythe  
George Lazenby as J.B.

References 

1983 television films
1983 films
1980s spy films
American spy films
Spy television films
Films based on television series
Television series reunion films
Films scored by Gerald Fried
CBS network films
The Man from U.N.C.L.E.
1980s English-language films
Films directed by Ray Austin
1980s American films